Korovinskaya is a rural locality (a village) in Vozhegodskoye Urban Settlement, Vozhegodsky District, Vologda Oblast, Russia. The population was 2 as of 2002.

Geography 
Korovinskaya is located 15 km southeast of Vozhega (the district's administrative centre) by road. Stepanikha is the nearest rural locality.

References 

Rural localities in Vozhegodsky District